Cuexcomate is an inactive geyser in Puebla city, Puebla state, Mexico.

Cuexcomate's name is derived from the Nahuatl term cuezcomatl "a large earthen jar used to store grain", because of its resemblance to such a vessel. Historically, it has been cited that the geyser was formed before the 1064 eruption of the Popocatépetl, an active volcano and the second highest peak in Mexico, which likely activated geothermal spring circulation that cut upward through Mesozoic limestone and deposited the geyser and the springs around it. The geyser's rock composition is 99% calcite, differing thus from typical silica sinter deposits.
  
Cuexcomate has been mistakenly called 'the smallest volcano in the world' because of the popular belief that it was indeed a volcano, based only on the shape of the structure; however, it is not a volcano. Today, there is a metal spiral staircase that allows tourists to descend into the excavated interior of the structure, where cultural events are occasionally done.

Characteristics
 Geyser Type: calcitic chemical deposit
 Height: 
 Crater Diameter: .
 Base Exterior Diameter: .
 Weight: approx. 400 tons.
 Mode of formation: emanating geothermal waters with occasional high-pressured bursts

Description
A description of Cuexcomate from the year 1585 says: "at one league from this city, close to the bridge that they call Cholula, there is in a large grassland... in circular shape, a rock of 6 or 7 estados high, at the top of which there is a great mouth as if it were made to hold a waterwheel. The which is very deep, and at the bottom of which there is foul smelling water, a very important thing to note: there they say that in the heathen days they threw in (indios) natives to be sacrificed to their idols."

The crater of Cuexcomate is an empty cone of an extinct geyser.

History
Cuexcomate was formed, in an area that was to become the town of La Libertad, by hydrothermal circulation prior to the 1064 eruption of Popocatépetl. La Libertad was incorporated into the city of Puebla in 1943. On November 27, 1970, a plaque was placed to commemorate the founding of La Libertad around the sides of the Cuexcomate geyser.

It was said that in ancient times, the people of Puebla threw the bodies of suicide victims into the crater, because they did not deserve to be mourned or buried.

During this same time, the people living around the geyser were said to be 'children of the devil' or 'under the rule of the devil', because of Cuexcomate.

It is believed that of the various tunnels that cross under the city of Puebla, one runs from the hill of Loreto to the hill of San Juan (now the hill of La Paz) and from there travels down to the hill Cuexcomate, afterward crossing under the Atoyac river and ending in the Archaeological zone of Cholula and its pyramids.

Tourism
The geyser is found at the intersection of 2 Poniente (west) and 3 Norte (north), in the Colonia La Libertad, Puebla.
 
There are spiral metal stairs that allow one to descend to the interior of the crater.

See also 

 Taal Volcano

References

Puebla (city)
Landforms of Puebla
Tourist attractions in Puebla
Geysers of Mexico